Trebević is a mountain in central Bosnia and Herzegovina, located to the southeast of Sarajevo, in the territory of East Sarajevo city, bordering Jahorina mountain.

During the Middle Ages, Trebević was known as Zlatni Do. During the 1984 Winter Olympics Trebević, like the other Sarajevo mountains, was used for a number of Olympic events, such as bobsledding.

Trebević today is important as a tourist destination for citizens of Sarajevo as Igman or Bjelašnica. Most of the land mines are now cleared from heavy fighting that took place in the early 1990s. There are a few hotels, mountaineering homes, and other such structures on Trebević and the immediate area. The mountain is very popular for family picnics, hiking, climbing, mountain biking and it has a downhill track for local and international skiing competitions.

Trebević has been the main excursion site for Sarajevo citizens due to the favorable geographical position, climate and the beauty of the nature. The biological diversity is among the highest and it is extraordinary to find such a phenomenon near the heart of the big city. On 9 April 2014, Sarajevo Canton Assembly declared Trebević a protected area, in order to conserve and improve each element of the geographical and biological diversity.

Trebević can be reached from Sarajevo by the Trebević Cable Car, which starts from the neighbourhood of Bistrik.

Mineral and crystal deposits

The area is known to contain quartz, siderite, and calcite crystal deposits, and one such item is on display in Sarajevo at the National Museum of Bosnia and Herzegovina.

History

1984 Winter Olympics

Orthodox cross controversy
The idea followed a move by Bosnian Croats who erected a Catholic Christian cross on Hum Hill above Mostar, remembering Croats killed there during the Bosnian War. High Representative for Bosnia and Herzegovina Miroslav Lajčák asked Republika Srpska authorities not to allow the construction of the cross.

The structure was built in early 2014, only for it to be demolished within a month by persons unknown. There has recently been talk about its reconstruction; however, this has yet to materialise due to the fear of it being demolished once again.

References

Mountains of Republika Srpska
Mountains of the Federation of Bosnia and Herzegovina
Istočno Sarajevo
Geography of Sarajevo
Mountains of Bosnia and Herzegovina
Nature parks of Bosnia and Herzegovina
Protected areas of Bosnia and Herzegovina
Tourist attractions in Bosnia and Herzegovina
Protected areas established in 2014